Light Cavalry (French:Cavalerie légère) is a 1935 French-German musical film directed by Werner Hochbaum and starring Mona Goya, Gabriel Gabrio and Constant Rémy. It is the French-language version of Light Cavalry, part of a trend during the 1930s to make Multiple-language versions of productions. Like the German original, it uses music from the operetta Light Cavalry.

Cast
 Mona Goya as Rosika  
 Gabriel Gabrio as Chérubini  
 Constant Rémy as Flip  
 Jean-Louis Allibert as Géza von Rakos 
 Ernest Ferny as Palato  
 Line Noro as Mme. Palato  
 Marcel Vallée as Franconi 
 Raoul Marco as Pietro  
 Myno Burney as Catella  
 Fernand Fabre as Coloman

References

Bibliography 
 Goble, Alan. The Complete Index to Literary Sources in Film. Walter de Gruyter, 1999.

External links 
 

1935 films
German musical films
French musical films
1935 musical films
Operetta films
1930s French-language films
Films directed by Werner Hochbaum
Films set in Italy
Films set in Hungary
Circus films
French multilingual films
French black-and-white films
German black-and-white films
1935 multilingual films
1930s French films
1930s German films